Halichoeres cyanocephalus, or the yellowcheek wrasse, is a species of salt water wrasse found in the Western Atlantic Ocean, from Florida to Brazil.

Size

References

cyanocephalus
Taxa named by Marcus Elieser Bloch
Fish described in 1791